The Woman's Club of Winter Park is a historic woman's club in Winter Park, Florida. It is located at 419 Interlachen Avenue. On May 4, 1995, it was added to the U.S. National Register of Historic Places.

Origins

The original planners of the club were Lucy Blackman, Alice Knox, and Lucy Meriwether in 1914.  However, these women were not the official founders of the club.  That honor goes to Mrs. Helen Morse who officially held the Women's Club first meeting in ‘Osceola Lodge’ on January 15, 1915. Mrs. Morse was the first president of the club with Mrs. Blackman as her vice President and Mrs. Hiram Power as secretary/treasurer.

See also
List of Registered Historic Woman's Clubhouses in Florida

References

External links
 Woman's Club of Winter Park Homepage
 Orange County listings at National Register of Historic Places
 Woman's Club of Winter Park at Florida's Office of Cultural and Historical Programs

National Register of Historic Places in Orange County, Florida
Women's clubs in Florida
Buildings and structures in Winter Park, Florida
Women's club buildings in Florida
1921 establishments in Florida